The 1973 Norwich City Council election took place on 7 June 1973 to elect members of Norwich City Council in England. This was on the same day as other local elections. Voting took place across 16 wards, each electing 3 Councillors. Following the Local Government Act 1972, this was the first election to the new non-metropolitan district council for Norfolk, which came into being on 1 April the following year. Labour took control of the Council after winning a comfortable majority of seats.

Summary

Election result

|}

References

Norwich
Norwich City Council elections
2000s in Norfolk